Leuthen may refer to:

 Lutynia, Środa Śląska County (German: Leuthen), a town in Poland
 Battle of Leuthen, a 1757 battle during the Seven Years' War
 Wolf pack Leuthen, a group of German U-boats that operated during the Battle of the Atlantic in World War II